, 243 players have been Black Ferns. The "first" Black Fern was Jacquileen Apiata, which was decided by alphabetical order, while the most recent Black Fern is Santo Taumata — #244.

List

External links 
 Black Ferns by playing order

 
Lists of New Zealand sportspeople
Lists of New Zealand sportswomen